LeftWord Books is a New Delhi-based publisher that seeks to reflect the views of the Left in India and South Asia. Its Managing Director is Prakash Karat, the former General Secretary of the Communist Party of India (Marxist), or CPI(M).
The Chief Editor is Vijay Prashad and the Managing Editor is the actor-publisher Sudhanva Deshpande.

History 
LeftWord Books was founded in 1999 as the publishing division of Naya Rasta Publishers Private Limited. It was conceived by a group of Leftist intellectuals including Prabhat Patnaik, Aijaz Ahmad, Indira Chandrasekhar, Prakash Karat, V. K. Ramachandran and N. Ram and sometimes regarded as "the English publishing arm of the Communist Party of India (Marxist)". It is managed by the Managing Editor Sudhanva Deshpande, who had earlier worked with Tulika Books during 1994–98 and continues to be involved with the theatre group Jana Natya Manch.  LeftWord differs from Tulika Books, according to Deshpande, by being explicitly Leftist.

The company runs the May Day Bookstore and Cafe in New Delhi, as well as Internet retailing, through which it sells books from various Leftist publishers including Tulika Books. It also has a membership-based book club, whose subscriptions served to form the seed capital of the publishing division. By mid-2000, the company established itself as a successful publisher with several well-subscribed titles.

Book series 
 LeftWord Classics
 SIGNPOST: The Issues that Matter

Selected titles 
 Mark Twain, King Leopold's Soliloquy, .
 Fidel Castro, The Gigantic Casino: Reflections on the World Financial Crisis, .
 Hugo Chavez, The South Also Exists, .
 Carlos Ferrer, Becoming Che, .
 Teo Ballve, Vijay Prashad, Dispatches From Latin America- Experimenting Against Neoliberalism, .
 John Harriss, Depoliticizing Development: The World Bank and Social Capital,  (also issued by London: Anthem Press).
 E. M. S. Namboodiripad, History, Society, and Land Relations: Selected Essays, .
 Thomas Isaac, Richard W. Franke, Local Democracy and Development: The Kerala People's Campaign for Decentralized Planning,  (also issued by Rowman & Littlefield, 
 Prakash Karat, Subordinate Ally: The Nuclear Deal and India-US Strategic Relations, .
 Harkishan Singh Surjeet, History of the Communist Movement in India, Vol. 1: The Formative Years, 1920-1933, .
 Richard Levins, Talking about Trees: Science, Ecology, and Agriculture in Cuba, .
 Utsa Patnaik, The Agrarian Question In Marx And His Successors, .
 Aijaz Ahmad, Irfan Habib, Prabhat Patnaik, A World To Win: Essays on the Communist Manifesto, .
 A. G. Noorani, The RSS and the BJP: A Division of Labour, .
 A. G. Noorani, Savarkar and Hindutva: The Godse Connection, .
 Dwijendra Narayan Jha, The Many Careers of DD Kosambi, .
 Vijay Prashad, The Darker Nations- A Biography of the Short-Lived Third World, .
 Vijay Prashad, War against the planet: the fifth Afghan war, imperialism, and other assorted fundamentalisms, .
 Archana Prashad, Environmentalism and the left: contemporary debates and future agendas in tribal areas, .
 N. Ram, Riding the nuclear tiger, .
 Praveen Swami, The Kargil War, .
 Parvathi Menon, Breaking Barriers: Stories of Twelve Women, .
 Ninan Koshy, Under the Empire: India's New Foreign Policy, .
 Govind Deshpande, Selected Writings Of Jotirao Phule, ,.
 C. P. Chandrasekhar, Jayati Ghosh, The market that failed: a decade of neoliberal economic reforms in India, .
 Prabir Purkayastha, Ninan Koshy, M. K. Bhadrakumar, Uncle Sam's Nuclear Cabin, .
 Madhura Swaminathan, Weakening welfare: the public distribution of food in India, .
 Githa Hariharan, From India to Palestine — Essays in Solidarity, .
 K. Chandru, Listen to My Case!,

References 

1999 establishments in Delhi
Book publishing companies of India
Leftist organisations in India
Publishing companies established in 1999